The 2008 Women's European Union Amateur Boxing Championships were held in the Greenbank Sports Academy in Liverpool, England from August 4 to 8. This was the 3rd edition of this annual competition, and was organised by the European governing body for amateur boxing, EABA.

80 fighters representing 17 federations competed in 13 weight divisions. Turkey returned to top spot on the medals table with 4 gold and 4 bronze medals. Host country England won her first gold medals in these competitions, as did Ireland in the person of 60 kg World Champion Katie Taylor.

Medal winners

Medal count table

References

2008 Women's European Union Amateur Boxing Championships
2008 Women's European Union Amateur Boxing Championships
Women's European Union Amateur Boxing Championships
2000s in Liverpool
International sports competitions in Liverpool
International boxing competitions hosted by the United Kingdom
European